Ken Forge (born 7 April 1942) is a former Australian rules footballer who played with Essendon in the Victorian Football League (VFL). He retired after injuring his knee and later played one match for Pharmacy College in the Victorian Amateur Football Association.

Notes

External links 		
		

Essendon Football Club past player profile
		
		
		

1942 births
Living people
Australian rules footballers from Victoria (Australia)
Essendon Football Club players
People educated at Melbourne Grammar School
Victorian Amateur Football Association players